Evelyn Chan Lu Ee is a Singaporean bowler.

In 2003, Chan won the 36th Singapore International Open, her first International title.

At the 2nd Commonwealth Tenpin Bowling Championships in 2005, Chan won bronze medal at the Ladies Singles event and the gold medal with Jennifer Tan.

Chan was also part of the Singapore woman bowling team which won bronze in the Women's Team of Five at bowling at the 2005 Southeast Asian Games and Women's Trios at bowling at the 2007 Southeast Asian Games. For those accomplishments, she received the Singapore Bowling Federation's Recognition Awards in 2006 and 2007.

Chan, as part of the women's bowling team, was also awarded the Meritorious Award (Team) of the Singapore Sports Awards in 2007.

References

Living people
Singaporean sportspeople of Chinese descent
Singaporean ten-pin bowling players
Bowlers at the 2006 Asian Games
Asian Games medalists in bowling
Year of birth missing (living people)
Place of birth missing (living people)
Asian Games bronze medalists for Singapore
Medalists at the 2006 Asian Games
Southeast Asian Games bronze medalists for Singapore
Southeast Asian Games medalists in bowling
Competitors at the 2005 Southeast Asian Games